The SuperCat Fast Ferry Corporation, commonly known as SuperCat, is a shipping company that operates a fleet of high-speed catamarans (HSC) in the Philippines. It is now part of Chelsea Logistics Holdings Corporation. Supercat was previously the sister company of SuperFerry, Cebu Ferries and 2GO Travel. Supercat operated 7 vessels in 7 ports around the Philippines.

Brief history

Batangas - Calapan route is one of the most important shipping routes in the Philippines. During the early 1990s, the route was dominated by a single large shipping company. Travelling during those days could take up to 3 hours and be uncomfortable. In 1994, Rodolfo G. Valencia, then Governor of Oriental Mindoro, invited the Aboitiz Group to ply the route. His intention was to bring a more convenient and faster alternative to Mindoro. Under the management of Universal Aboitiz Inc., M/V SuperCat 1, their pioneer vessel, traveled between Batangas and Calapan in only 45 minutes. 

SuperCat added routes throughout the Visayas Region. High-speed crafts became popular in the Philippines. In 1997, Sea Angels (owned by Negros Navigation) merged with Universal Aboitiz and Hong Kong Park View Holdings to form the Philippine Fast Ferry Corporation. SuperCat also acquired the 2 vessels of Waterjet Shipping Corporation (owned by Waterjet Netherlands Antilles). They renamed it as SuperCat 17 (former Waterjet 1, currently FastCat Ryde) and Supercat 18 (former Waterjet 2, currently FastCat Shanklin). The merger was eventually dissolved in 2002 and SuperCat became solely owned by Aboitiz. The abolition of the WG&A merger then soon unraveled. SuperCat sacrificed some of its vessels and their corresponding routes in order to sustain its fast craft operations. SuperCat also downsized from 200 to just 100 employees.

From the 1990s to early 2000s, all SuperCat vessels were waterjet-propelled. Due to economic problems, Aboitiz was forced sell ships reducing an original fleet of fourteen down to just seven.

To cope with the soaring fuel prices, SuperCat started replacing their previous fleet with more fuel-efficient vessels. At present, all jet-powered SuperCat HSC vessels were replaced by more fuel efficient vessels using a simple propulsion system.

Destinations

Current Destinations

Batangas City, Batangas
Bacolod, Negros Occidental
Calapan, Oriental Mindoro
Cebu City, Cebu
Iloilo City, Iloilo
Ormoc City, Leyte
Tagbilaran City, Bohol

Active Routes 
Batangas - Calapan v v. (1 hour 10 minutes)
Bacolod - Iloilo v.v. (1 hour)
Cebu - Ormoc v v. (2 hours and 20 minutes)
Cebu - Tagbilaran v v. (1 hour 45 minutes)

Fleet
The Supercat fleet was mainly composed of high-speed catamarans, but they also owned monohulled vessels.

Vessels

St. Nuriel (formerly Supercat 22)

St. Nuriel used to be SuperCat 22 M/V Mt. Samat Ferry 3, which was operated by defunct Philippine fast ferry company, Mt. Samat. The Supercat 22 was built by FBMA Marine Inc. (an Aboitiz Company) in Balamban, Cebu. This vessel uses a simple propulsion system, and is very fuel efficient. In July 2010, she was added a second deck. She is currently serving the Batangas - Calapan route. On October 26, 2020, St. Nuriel capsized in Batangas port during the wrath of Typhoon Rolly.

St. Uriel (formerly SuperCat 23)
St. Uriel was the only high speed monohull vessel in the Supercat fleet. She uses a simple propulsion system and her fuel is efficient. She also offers an open deck accommodation at a more affordable price. She is currently in regular service on Bacolod - Iloilo route.

St. Sealthiel (formerly SuperCat 25)
St. Sealthiel used to be SuperCat 25 & M/V Mt. Samat Ferry 5, which was operated by defunct Philippine fast ferry company, Mt. Samat. She is a sister ship of Supercat 22 and was also built by FBMA Marine Inc. (an Aboitiz Company) in Balamban, Cebu. Similarly this vessel uses a simple propulsion system, and is very fuel efficient. She was renamed as M/V Smart in Korea, before ending up with Supercat Fast Ferry Corp. She is serving the Bacolod - Iloilo route.

St. Emmanuel (formerly SuperCat 26)
SuperCat 26 used to be SeaCat from Australia, traveling Perth to Rottnest Island. She has twin Caterpillar C32 engines and can cruise up to 28 knots. She's 25m in length. She is serving the Bacolod-Iloilo route in the Western Visayas region of the Philippines.

St. Jhudiel (formerly SuperCat 30)
St. Jhudiel used to be SuperCat 30, one of Elbe City Jet's catamaran. She was named Hanseblitz from 1996 to 2001 and was reconfigured and elevated its Captain's bridge at Abeking & Rasmussen, and later on acquired by Transtejo in Lisboa, Portugal renamed Bairro Alto until early 2008. She has two decks. The upper deck offers business class accommodation. This vessel was built by Lindstol Skips, in Risor Norway. Unlike the other Supercat vessels, this vessel is equipped with controllable pitch propellers as its propulsion system. Supercat 32 is her sister ship. She is serving the Cebu - Ormoc - Cebu and Cebu - Tagbilaran - Cebu Route.

St. Braquiel (formerly SuperCat 32)
St. Braquiel used to be SuperCat 32, one of Elbe City Jet's catamaran. She was named Hansepfeil from 1996 to 2002 and was reconfigured and elevated its Captain's bridge at Abeking & Rasmussen, and later on acquired by Transtejo in Lisboa, Portugal renamed Parque das Nacoes until early 2008. She has two decks. The upper deck offers business class accommodation. This vessel was built by Lindstol Skips, in Risor Norway. Unlike the other Supercat vessels, this vessel is equipped with controllable pitch propellers as its propulsion system. Supercat 30 is her sister ship. As of December 2018, she is currently serving in the Iloilo-Bacolod-Iloilo route.

St. Dominic (formerly SuperCat 38)
St. Dominic, formerly known as SuperCat 38 and Sir David Martin, is one of three Sydney JetCats purchased for the Manly service to replace hydrofoils. She operated from Manly to Circular Quay from 1990 until 2008 before being sold to Supercat. She uses a KAMEWA waterjet-propulsion and her maximum service speed can reach up to 31 knots. On October 26, 2020, St. Dominic capsized in Batangas port during the wrath of Typhoon Rolly.

St. Camael and St. Sariel 
In June 2017, Austal Philippines delivered the first of two 30-meter catamarans to SuperCat Fast Ferry Corporation, MV St. Camael.  Each of the high speed ferries can carry up to 300 passengers, and can cruise at 25 knots. In July 2017, St. Camael's sister ship, MV St. Sariel, was also delivered. St. Camael commenced operations on the Cebu-Ormoc route, while St. Sariel serves the Cebu-Tagbilaran route.

As of May 2021, St. Camael is now serving the Iloilo-Bacolod route.

Sprint 1

Former vessels

Supercat 1 (sank-off en route to Calapan, Mindoro)
Supercat - I (sold to Emeraude Lines renamed as NORMANDIE EXPRESS, later renamed as Moorea Express)
Supercat 2 (sold to Korean Shipping Company KOREA EXPRESS FERRY CO., Ltd, renamed as Korea Express)
Supercat 3 (sold to Croatian Shipping Company Jadrolinija, renamed as Karolina )
Supercat 5 (sold to Croatian Shipping Company Jadrolinija, renamed as Judita)
Supercat 6 (sold to Moreton Bay Whale Watching, sold to Seo Kyung Korea renamed as Gold Coast)
Supercat 7 (sold to Croatian Shipping Company Jadrolinija, renamed as Novalja)
Supercat 8 (sold to Croatian Shipping Company Jadrolinija, renamed as Dubravka)
Supercat 9 (sold to Croatian Shipping Company, renamed as Bisovo)
Supercat 10 (sold to Korean Shipping Company WONDERFUL ISLAND CO., renamed as Mosulpo 1 (모슬포1호))
Supercat 11: St. Raphael (sold to Italian Shipping Company Ustica Lines, renamed as Federica M)
Supercat 12: St. Gabriel (sold to Italian Shipping Company Ustica Lines, renamed as Gabrielle M)
Supercat 17 (sold to Wightlink for use between Portsmouth and Ryde, Renamed as FastCat-Ryde. Sold to Alien Shipping, renamed as Sochi-1)
Supercat 18 (sold to Wightlink for use between Portsmouth and Ryde, Renamed as FastCat-Shanklin. Sold to Alien Shipping, renamed as Sochi-2)
Supercat 20 (sold to South African Shipping Company FakoShip, renamed as Endurance)
Supercat 21 (returned to her lessor )
Supercat 2001/Tricat 50 (sold, renamed as SEA POWER 1)
Supercat 2002 (sold to a Dutch Shipping Company, renamed as Tiger)
Supercat 36 Formerly St. Benedict, Sold to undisclosed buyer on August 19, 2021 for PHP 2.5 million.

Trivia

In September 1994, M/V SuperCat 1 sank near Verde Island. There were no casualties. All passengers were rescued by another RORO vessel. There were speculations that the vessel was sabotaged. It was not proven though.
SuperCat 6 was the smallest SuperCat vessel
In commemoration of the Philippine Independence Centennial, SuperCat repainted some of its vessels with a "Philippine Flag Livery".
TriCat 50 was renamed as SuperCat 2001.
SuperCat had already owned three (3) mono hull fast crafts (namely SC 20, 21 & 23) in its history.
The brand "SuperCat" was derived from two words, "SUPER" and "CATamaran"
Sharon Cuneta filmed SuperCat's TV Ad in both Batangas City and Calapan. The Ad was only advertised on board and through local cable networks TV Ad in Roxas, Oriental Mindoro and Iloilo City.
SuperCat used to have its own exclusive terminal and docking area in Calapan. This was built after the loss of SuperCat 1 where sabotage was suspected. The terminal was eventually demolished after a bigger and better public terminal was opened for use in the second quarter of 2010.
SuperCat was sued for mandating an additional terminal fee on top of the fare in Calapan, for use of their newly constructed exclusive terminal. SuperCat was then forced to remove the terminal fee.
The catamaran Judita, formerly SuperCat 5, is now labeled as the "Pope's Catamaran". Pope John Paul II rode Judita from Omišalj to Rijeka in his visit to Croatia

See also
SuperFerry
Montenegro Lines
Cebu Ferries
Negros Navigation
Roble Shipping Inc.
List of shipping companies in the Philippines

References

External links
Aboitiz Transport sale: hard decision after marking 100 yrs  (archived from the original on 2009-06-26)
http://www.supercat.com.ph/index.asp

Ferries of the Philippines
Ferry companies of the Philippines
Shipping companies of the Philippines
Transportation in Cebu
Companies based in Cebu City
Defunct transportation companies of the Philippines